Castle Mound may refer to:
Local name of the Cambridge Castle
 , part of the Kernavė Mounds complex, Lithuania
 a.k.a. Castle Mound, Lithuania

See also
Castle Mountain (disambiguation)
Castle Hill (disambiguation)
 Schlossberg (disambiguation),  "Castle Hill" in German
Zamkova Hora (disambiguation),  "Castle Hill" in Ukrainian